Gamaliel Smith Olds, a Congregational minister, was born February 11, 1777, in Tolland, Massachusetts. He graduated from Williams College in 1801; held the position of tutor from 1803 to 1805; and in 1806 was elected professor of mathematics and natural philosophy, but resigned in 1808, and studied theology, and was ordained co-pastor in Greenfield, Massachusetts, November 19, 1813, where he remained until 1816. In 1819 he was chosen professor of mathematics and natural philosophy at the University of Vermont; and in 1821 professor of the same studies in Amherst College. Some years afterwards he filled the same chair at the University of Georgia. He died from the effects of an accident at Circleville, Ohio on June 13, 1848.  Olds published an Inaugural Oration at Williams College (1806); The Substance of several Sermons upon the subjects of Episcopacy and Presbyterian Purity (1815); and Statement of Facts relative to the Appointment to the Office of Professor of Chemistry in Middlebury College (1818). See Sprague, Annals of the Ame. Pulpit 2:586.

References

1777 births
1848 deaths

American Congregationalist ministers
People from Massachusetts
Williams College alumni
Williams College faculty
University of Vermont faculty
Amherst College faculty
University of Georgia faculty
American religious writers